Timaru Boys' High School (also known as TBHS), established in 1880, is a single sex state (public) secondary school located in the port city of Timaru, South Canterbury, New Zealand. TBHS caters for years 9 to 13 (ages 12 to 19 years).

At the beginning of the 2017 school year, the school had more than 650 students.

Traditions 
There are four houses, each named after a former rector and led by a house captain. Every one in the school competes in inter-house programs to earn points for their house. These include cross country, athletics, swimming sports, singing, volleyball, basketball and quadball tournaments. The houses compete annually for the Cleland Cup.

Sport 
TBHS plays in 5 traditional interschool fixtures:
 Christchurch Boys' High School
 St Andrew's College, Christchurch
 Otago Boys' High School
 Waitaki Boys' High School. This is the longest running non-stop inter-school fixture in New Zealand.
 John McGlashan College. This fixture begun in 2018.

Rugby 
The Timaru Boys' High School 1st XV competes in the Crusaders' Region Secondary Schools' Rugby Championship "The UC Cup."

The 1st XV made it into the finals of the UC Cup for the first time in the 2017 season.

Thomas House boarding hostel 
The Thomas House boarding hostel is attached to and is an integral part of the school. Built in 1907, Thomas House, named after the school's first rector, welcomed in its first eight boarders in 1908. In 2010 it held just over 80 boarders; by 2017, Thomas House reached capacity with 119 boarders. Thomas House has several wings. The Fraser Wing from 1962 is named after Hanson Fraser, who chaired the board of governors for two decades. The Jubilee Wing from 1984 commemorates the 75th jubilee of the boarding hostel. The Manning Wing commemorates several members of the Manning family who worked at the boarding hostel. The Lindsay Wing commemorates two cousins of the same name who both represented New Zealand internationally in 1928: David Lindsay went to the Olympics as a swimmer and Dave Lindsay was a member of the 1928 New Zealand rugby union tour of South Africa.

Notable alumni

Academia 

 Harold Williams (1876–1928), linguist

The arts 
 Michael Houstoun (b 1952), concert pianist
 Kevin Smith (1963–2002), actor
 Jeff Wassmann (b 1958), artist
Mika Haka (b 1962), performance artist

Business 

 Sir Roy McKenzie (1922–2007), businessman & philanthropist

Medicine 

 Sir William Manchester (1913-2001), plastic and reconstructive surgeon

Public service 
 Thomas Burnett (1877–1941), MP for Temuka (1919–1941)
 Frank Kitts (1912–1979), Wellington mayor and MP
 Sir Ivor Richardson (1930–2014), Privy Councillor and jurist
 Jim Sutton (b 1941), MP for Waitaki, Timaru, Aoraki, and List MP, and cabinet minister

Sport 

 Jack Lovelock (1910–1949), athlete, 1936 Olympic 1500m champion
 George T. A. Adkins (1910–1976), All Black (uncapped) 1935–1936
 Dick Tayler (b 1948), athlete, 1974 Commonwealth Games 10,000m Champion
 Craig Cumming (b 1975), New Zealand cricket player 2003–2007
 Brendan Laney (b 1973), Scotland rugby player 2001–2004
 Isaac Ross (b 1984), All Black 2009
 Archie Strang (1908–1969), All Black 1928–1931
 Hayden Paddon (b 1987), motorsport, World Rally Championship driver, 2007–present
 Marc Ryan (b 1982), cycling, bronze medallist at 2008 Olympics and 2012 Olympics
 Hamish Bennett (b 1987), New Zealand cricket player 2010–present
 Aki Seiuli (b 1992), professional rugby player 2012–present
 Tomas Walsh (b 1992), athlete, shot put bronze medallist at 2016 Olympics
 Lachie Grant (1908–1969), All Black 1947–1951
Cullen Grace (b 1999), All Black 2020–present

Notes

External links 

 Timaru Boys' HS Homepage

Boarding schools in New Zealand
Boys' schools in New Zealand
Educational institutions established in 1880
Timaru
Secondary schools in Canterbury, New Zealand
1880 establishments in New Zealand